Brazil is an unincorporated community in Appanoose County, Iowa, United States.

History
Brazil was historically noted for its coal mining. The community contained at least three mines.

References

Unincorporated communities in Appanoose County, Iowa
Unincorporated communities in Iowa